3-Benzoxepin is an annulated ring system with an aromatic benzene ring and a non-aromatic, unsaturated, oxygen-containing seven-membered heterocyclic oxepin.  The first synthesis was described by Karl Dimroth and coworkers in 1961.  It is one of the three isomers of  the benzoxepins.

Occurrence and synthesis 
3-Benzoxepin itself is a non-natural compound, but the bicyclic ring system is part of the naturally occurring compounds  perilloxin (I) from Perilla frutescens (variant acuta) and tenual (II) and tenucarb (III) from Asphodeline tenuior. Perilloxin inhibits the enzyme cyclooxygenase with an IC50 of 23.2 μM. Non-steroidal anti-inflammatory drugs like aspirin and ibuprofen also work by inhibiting the cyclooxygenase enzyme family.

Unsubstituted 3-benzoxepin can be synthesized through a double Wittig reaction from o-phthalaldehyde with bis-(α,α′-triphenylphosphonium)-dimethylether-dibromide. The latter compound can be synthesized from α,α′-dibromodimethyl ether (bis(bromomethyl)ether or BBME) which is accessible from hydrobromic acid, paraformaldehyde, and triphenylphosphine.  The reaction is performed in dry methanol with sodium methoxide, and the product is obtained in 55% yield.

The compound can also be obtained through UV-irratiation of certain naphthalene derivatives such as 1,4-epoxy-1,4-dihydronaphthalene.

It can also be obtained by photooxidation of 1,4-dihydronaphthalene, followed by pyrolysis of the formed hydroperoxides.

The latter syntheses give 3-benzoxepins in low yields (4–6%).

Properties
3-Benzoxepin is a bright yellow solid that crystallizes in platelets, with a smell similar to naphthalene.  The material is soluble in apolar, organic solvents.  Like naphthalene, it can be purified through sublimation.  The solid is relatively acid-resistant, only under refluxing in concentrated, acidic alcohol solutions an unsaturated aldehyde is formed (likely an indene-3-aldehyde).  Catalytic hydrogenation with a palladium catalyst results in 1,2,4,5-tetrahydro-3-benzoxepin.

References 

Oxepines
Enzyme inhibitors
3-Benzoxepines